DB Draw is a derelict railroad swing bridge crossing the Hackensack River between Secaucus and Kearny, in New Jersey, United States. It was built in 1889 by the New York, Lake Erie and Western Railroad, (reorganized in 1895 as the Erie Railroad) and was used by the New York and Greenwood Lake and the Newark Branch.

The bridge later carried New Jersey Transit's Boonton Line until the line was connected to the Montclair Branch via the Montclair Connection, to form the Montclair-Boonton Line. The bridge then reverted to Norfolk Southern Railway control, which has since placed it out of service. It was decommissioned in October 2002 and left in an open position for river traffic.

As of 2022, the line is being converted to a rail trail.

See also 
 List of crossings of the Hackensack River

References 

Bridges in Hudson County, New Jersey
Erie Railroad bridges
Bridges over the Hackensack River
Railroad bridges in New Jersey
Transportation in Hudson County, New Jersey
Secaucus, New Jersey
Kearny, New Jersey
NJ Transit bridges
Bridges completed in 1889
Truss bridges in the United States
Metal bridges in the United States
Swing bridges in the United States
1889 establishments in New Jersey

2002 disestablishments in New Jersey